North Central University (NCU) is a private Christian university associated with the Assemblies of God and located in Minneapolis, Minnesota. It is owned and operated by 11 Assemblies of God districts of the upper Midwest. NCU was founded in 1930 and is accredited by the Higher Learning Commission. It is one of 17 Assemblies of God institutions of higher education in the United States.

Academics

Academic and spiritual requirements
All of North Central University's bachelor's programs contain a General Education Core, a Christian Studies Core, and a Major Core, most of which can be earned by completing 124 credits. The Christian Studies Core is a required portion of all bachelor's degrees. Students are also required to attend a daily chapel service and can voluntarily attend other methods of spiritual formation, both faculty- and student-led.

Student lifestyle
Students must agree to a student code of conduct common to many Christian universities. They are prohibited from activities such as alcohol consumption and tobacco use and must adhere to curfew restrictions and other policies designed to help them develop character and maintain a Christian lifestyle. As the school has grown the rules have fluctuated. Debate as to the viability of certain rules continues among both students and employees.

The university has a partial exception to Title IX which allows it to legally discriminate against LGBT students for religious reasons. Homosexual relationships are forbidden by policy. Several students have been forced to leave the school because they were vocal about LGBT identity or for having gay relationships, even nonsexual.

Ministry focus
While transitioning into a Christian liberal arts university, NCU has retained its ministry focus and Bible college roots. Each major has a Christian Studies core as part of the curriculum. Each major is focused on providing professional competency while equipping students to live out their Christian faith in both secular and church roles. It blends academic rigor with Pentecostal spirituality. Daily chapel services are a key component of campus life. Many students are involved in local churches or provide ministry leadership for campus groups and organizations.

Deaf Studies
Established in 1974 by Rev. J. David Fleck, the Deaf Studies program offered degrees to deaf students preparing for vocational ministry positions. The program was one of first in the country. A unique aspect of the program was that it allowed students to practice their ASL skills in daily chapel services or local churches. The program has since been terminated and replaced most closely by the ASL Interpreting program.

On-campus housing
NCU has six different living areas. One of the reserved buildings is the 1500 building. It is right outside the cafeteria and reserved for married couples enrolled at North Central. The 901 building is open to NCU staff. Another exclusive building on campus is the Orfield Apartments. These are right across from the sanctuary and reserved for upperclassmen. And there are three dorms, Phillips Hall, Miller Hall, and Carlson Hall. Phillips is a co-ed suite-style dorm with same-sex floors. Miller is for female residents and houses 200 students. Carlson is for men and also houses 200.

Colleges, schools, and departments

College of Arts and Sciences
 School of Education
 School of Social & Behavioral Sciences & Communication Arts
 Department of Carlstrom ASL-Interpreting
 Department of English and Communication Arts

College of Business and Technology
 School of Business
 School of Technology

College of Fine Arts
 School of Music and Theater
 School of Worship Arts

College of Church Leadership
 School of Biblical and Theological Studies
 School of Global Studies
 School of Pastoral Studies

College of Graduate and Professional Education

Athletics
The Rams are members of the NCAA Division III intercollegiate teams for men—baseball, basketball, cross country, golf, lacrosse, soccer, tennis, and track and field; for women— basketball, cross country, golf, soccer, softball, tennis, track and field, and volleyball. A variety of club and intramural sports are available. The Clark-Danielson College Life Center Gymnasium is the home court for the basketball and volleyball teams. The CLC center was refurbished in late 2016. Partnering with the city of Minneapolis, a full-sized soccer field was completed in 2015. This field is home to the Men and Women's soccer teams and men's lacrosse team. Prior to 1998, the school's nickname had been the "Flames" with black and red the school colors. 

During 2012, North Central became an associate member of the Upper Midwest Athletic Conference (UMAC) in all varsity sports. NCU became a full member of the UMAC in 2013. In 2018, the men's soccer team claimed the DII National Christian College Athletic Association (NCCAA) National Championship crown, their overall record was 13-7-2.

Radio station
In 2007, FM radio station KNOF, which broadcast a Full Gospel schedule of programs and southern gospel music, was donated to the University. A partnership was formed between Praise Broadcasting and the University to offer a variety of worship music throughout the day.
At the start of the Fall 2008 semester, it was announced that the radio station would be moved to the former Comm Arts building right behind the Trask Worship Center.

In 2014, the University sold KNOF to Praise Bradcasting for $5 million. Praise soon sold the signal to the Pohlad family for $8 million. The Pohlads converted the station into KZGO 95.3 Go, a mix of modern and old-school rap and hip-hop. By July 2021, Praise had repurchased the station and reinstated the KNOF call letters and religious format.

Presidents
The Rev. F. J Lindquist 1930-1961
Dr. G. Raymond Carlson 1961-1969
The Rev. Cyril E. Homer 1970-1971
The Rev. D.H. Mapson (Interim) 1971
Dr. E. M. Clark 1971-1979
Dr. Don Argue 1979-1995
Dr. Gordon Anderson 1995-June 2017
Dr. Scott Hagan June 2017-

Notable alumni
 Jim Bakker, Evangelist 
 Tammy Faye Bakker, Evangelist
 Gary Dop, American poet 
 Sara Groves, Musician
 Dallas Holm, Singer/songwriter
 Mike Kopp, Colorado State Senator
 Jeremy Messersmith, Musician
 Wes Modder, Military Chaplain 
 Jonathan Thulin, Singer/songwriter
 Jerome Tang, head basketball coach for Kansas State

Notable faculty
 Jeff Deyo, Musician

See also
 List of colleges and universities in Minnesota

References

External links

Official athletics website

 
Pentecostalism in Minnesota
Liberal arts colleges in Minnesota
Universities and colleges affiliated with the Assemblies of God
Educational institutions established in 1930
Universities and colleges in Minneapolis
1930 establishments in Minnesota
Private universities and colleges in Minnesota
Council for Christian Colleges and Universities